The Sanctuary of Asclepius was a sanctuary in Epidaurus dedicated to Asclepius. Especially in the Classical and Hellenistic periods, it was the main holy site of Asclepius. The sanctuary at Epidaurus was the rival of such major cult sites as the Sanctuary of Zeus at Olympia and Apollo at Delphi. The temple was built in the early 4th century BC.  If still in use by the 4th century AD, the temple would have been closed during the persecution of pagans in the late Roman Empire, when the Christian Emperors issued edicts prohibiting non-Christian worship. In 1988, the temple was inscribed on the UNESCO World Heritage List because of its exceptional architecture and its importance in the development and spread of healing sanctuaries (asclepeion) throughout Classical Antiquity.

Myth

The 2nd century AD geographer Pausanias described the myth around the foundation of the temple, as well as its religious significance to the worship of Asclepius (Description of Greece 2.26-28). According to him, Coronis, daughter of Phlegyas, had been impregnated by Apollo and gave birth to Asclepius at Epidaurus, exposing the newborn baby on Mount Myrtion, where he was nursed by a goat (usually identified with Kynortion hill to the west of the main sanctuary, where the sanctuary of Apollo Maleatas was located). The baby Asclepius is depicted with his goat on 2nd century AD Epidauran coinage.

History

In the 4th and 3rd centuries BC embarked on an ambitious building program for enlarging and reconstruction of monumental buildings. Fame and prosperity continued throughout the Hellenistic period. In the third century BC, one Isyllus established a new procession to celebrate the birthday of Asclepius, including a new sacred hymn, which he had inscribed in the sanctuary of Apollo Maleatas on Kynortion hill, which was believed to be Asclepius' birthplace. 

During the Achaean War in 146 BC, the Achaians converted the sanctuary into a stronghold. After Lucius Mummius defeated the Achaians and destroyed Corinth in 146 BC, he visited the sanctuary and left two dedications there. 

In 87 BC, the sanctuary was looted by the Roman general Sulla. In 74 BC, Marcus Antonius Creticus installed a garrison in the city causing a lack of grain. Sometime before 67 BC the sanctuary was plundered by pirates. Archaeological evidence reveals extensive damage in the first half of the first century BC. The guest house, gymnasium, and water supply system (required for most of the sanctuary's important rituals) were abandoned and the sanctuary of Apollo Maleatas was destroyed. Livy, in the early first century AD, speaks of "Epidaurus... was once rich with gifts for the god, which are now vestiges of wrecked dedications." Inscriptions claim that the town was rescued from total destruction by a series of gifts from a rich benefactor, Euanthes son of Eunomus, who was honoured with at least six monuments.

In the first century AD, the town was dominated by the wealthy Statilius and Claudius-Cornelius families, who dominated the main priestly offices, sponsored some construction work, and funded celebrations of the Apolloneia Asclapieia Caesarea Games.

In the 2nd century AD the sanctuary enjoyed a new upsurge, prompted by the visit of Hadrian to the site in 124. Hadrian introduced a range of reforms, apparently influenced by the cult of Asclepius at Pergamum, which he was closely involved with. The priesthood of Asclepius was reformed, so that it became an annual office selected by allotment, rather than a lifetime office. The emperor reorganised the Asclepieia Games and moved their date so that they would not clash with other festival games in Greece. New cults were introduced, dedicated to "All the gods," Zeus Olympius, Zeus Panhellenius, Telesphorus (closely associated with the Pergamene Asclepieium). Asclepius was increasing syncretised with Zeus and with Hadrian as Zeus Asclepius Soter ("saviour"). Contemporary coinage seems to depict Hadrian and Asclepius as interchangeable. The Epidaurians honoured Hadrian with a new era, in which documents were dated by the number of years since Hadrian's visit. 

In the 160s and 170s, a Roman senator from Nysa in Asia Minor, Sextus Julius Major Antoninus Pythodorus donated heavily to the sanctuary, which is recorded by Pausanias (2.27.6-7), honorific inscriptions and rooftiles stamped with his name found throughout the sanctuary.  His donations included a bathhouse of Asclepius ("the north-east baths") and a temple to Hygieia, Egyptian Asclepius, and Egyptian Apollo. He also restored the Stoa of Cotys, the sanctuary of the Epidotae ("Helping gods" such as Machaon, Podalirius, Hero doctor, Heracles, Tyche, Agathos Daimon, Nemesis, Artemis Enodia, Artemis Lysaea, Pan, Leto, Hypnos, and Oneiros), and the guest house. Other buildings of this period include the Library of Rufus and a small odeon in the gymnasium for "sacred theatre." As with the reforms under Hadrian, much of this work seems to have been inspired by the sanctuary at Pergamum. Other work focussed on reviving or restoring earlier Epidaurian cults and practices. Most notably, Pythodorus carried out extensive repairs to the Sanctuary of Apollo Maleatas, which had been abandoned since the early first century BC, adding a propylon, a nymphaeum, and a vast subterranean cistern ("the Skanà"). These repairs allowed the procession for Asclepius' birthday, instituted by Isyllus in the third century BC, to be revived.

In AD 395 the Goths raided the sanctuary. Even after the introduction of Christianity and the silencing of the oracles, the sanctuary at Epidaurus was still known as late as the mid 5th century as a Christian healing centre.

Description

The main sanctuary consisted of the Temple and a number of structures clustered around it. The Theatre of Epidaurus is located on the hillside northwest of the sanctuary. To the west of the sanctuary was a sacred grove. Beyond the grove on Kynortion hill was the subsidiary sanctuary of Apollo Maleatas.

Temple

The temple was Doric, six columns by eleven, measuring ca. 80 feet in length. An inscription excavated near the temple (Inscriptiones Graecae IV2 no. 102) gives a public record of the temple's construction.  The inscription names Theodotus as architect.  The project took nearly five years to complete.  The temple had pedimental sculpture, front and back, and figural acroteria.  These, the work of master sculptors of the period, occupy a prominent room in the National Archaeological Museum at Athens.

The gold and ivory cult statue of the god is described by Pausanias, who described the sanctuary in the 2nd century: 
The sacred grove of Asklepios is surrounded on all sides by boundary marks. No death or birth takes place within the enclosure; the same custom prevails also in the island of Delos. All the offerings, whether the offerer be one of the Epidaurians themselves or a stranger, are entirely consumed within the bounds. At Titane too, I know, there is this same rule. The image of Asklepios is, in size, half as big as Zeus Olympios at Athens, and is made of ivory and gold. An inscription tells us that the artist was Thrasymedes, a Parian, son of Arignotos. The god is sitting on a seat grasping a staff; the other hand he is holding above the head of the serpent; there is also a figure of a dog lying by his side. On the seat are wrought in relief the exploits of Argive heroes..." [...] "When I asked at Epidauros why they pour neither water nor olive oil on the image of Asklepios [to keep the ivory in good condition], the attendants at the sanctuary informed me that both the image of the god and the throne were built over a cistern.

The templeis preserved in foundations only.  Fragments of the upper structure, recovered in excavation, are in the  archaeological museum at the site.

The Temple of Asclepius itself was not alone on the site. Pausanias recorded several smaller buildings within the holy area and grove of the temple complex, such as a theatre, a temple of Artemis, an image of Epione, a sanctuary of Aphrodite and Themis, "a race-course... and a fountain worth seeing for its roof and general splendour."

Worship

The temple had major religious importance in the cult of Asclepius.  It was a site for holy pilgrimage from the entire ancient world, and influenced the worship of Asclepius in many other sanctuaries dedicated to him.  Pausanias described how serpents were considered sacred to the god on the site: "The serpents, including a peculiar kind of a yellowish colour, are considered sacred to Asklepios, and are tame with men."

Pausanias described the worship and the site's importance as a pilgrimage in the 2nd century: 
Over against the temple is the place where the suppliants of the god sleep. Near has been built a circular building of white marble, called Tholos (Round House) . . . Within the enclosure stood slabs; in my time six remained, but of old there were more. On them are inscribed the names of both the men and the women who have been healed by Asklepios, the disease also from which each suffered, and the means of cure. The dialect is Doric. Apart from the others is an old slab, which declares that Hippolytos dedicated twenty horses to the god. The Arikians tell a tale that agrees with the inscription on this slab, that when Hippolytos was killed, owing to the curses of Theseus, Asklepios raised him from the dead. On coming to life again he refused to forgive his father; rejecting his prayers, he went to the Arikians in Italy...

There were many legends, stories and miracles said to have taken place in the temple during the centuries of pilgrimage to it. 
Cicero alluded the merciful nature of Asclepius when he recounted how Dionysius I of Syracuse allegedly committed sacrilege at the sanctuary without divine punishment: "He gave orders for the removal of the golden beard of Aesculapius at Epidaurus, saying it was not fitting for the son to wear a beard when his father [Apollo] appeared in all his temples beardless... Nor did Aesculapius cause him to waste away and perish of some painful and lingering disease."

In the 3rd century, Aelian describes a legendary miracle taking place in the sanctuary: 
A woman suffered from an intestinal worm, and the cleverest doctors despaired of curing her. Accordingly, she went to Epidauros and prayed to the god [Asklepios] that she might be rid of the complaint that was lodged in her. The god was not at hand. The attendants of the temple however made her lie down in the place where the god was in the habit of healing his petitioners. And the woman lay quiet as she was bid; and the ministers of the god addressed themselves to her cure: they severed her head from the neck, and one of them inserted his hand and drew out the worm, which was a monstrous creature. But to adjust the head and to restore it to its former setting, this they always failed to do. Well, the god arrived and was enraged with the ministers for undertaking a task beyond their skill, and himself with the irresistible power of a god restored the head to the body and raised the stranger up again. For my part, O King Asklepios, of all gods the kindliest to man, I do not set Wormwood [as a cure for intestinal worms] against your skill (heaven forbid I should be so insensate!), but in considering Wormwood I was reminded of your beneficent action and of your astounding powers of healing. And there is no need to doubt that this herb also is a gift from you.

See also 
 List of Ancient Greek temples

Bibliography 

 Helmut Berve, Gottfried Gruben and Max Hirmer. Greek Temples, Theatres, and Shrines. New York 1963.
 Alison Burford, Greek Temple Builders at Epidauros: A Social and Economic Study of Building in the Asklepian Sanctuary During the Fourth and Early Third Centuries B.C. Liverpool 1969.
 William Bell Dinsmoor. The Architecture of Ancient Greece. 3rd ed. rev. London 1950.

 Arnold W. Lawrence. Greek Architecture. 4th ed. rev. with additions by R.A. Tomlinson. (Pelican History of Art) New Haven 1996.
 Lembidaki, Evi. 2002. "Three Sacred Buildings in the Asklepieion at Epidauros : New Evidence from Recent Archaeological Research." In Peloponnesian Sanctuaries and Cults: Proceedings of the Ninth International Symposium at the Swedish Institute at Athens, 11–13 June 1994. Edited  by Robin Hägg. Stockholm : Svenska Institutet i Athen, 123–136.
 LiDonnici, Lynn R. 1995. The Epidaurian Miracle Inscriptions: Text, Translation, and Commentary. Atlanta: Scholars.

 Mitchell-Boyask, Robin. 2008. Plague and the Athenian Imagination: Drama, History, and the Cult of Asclepius. Cambridge/New York:  Cambridge University Press.
Peek, W. 1969. Inschriften aus dem Asklepieion von Epidauros, Berlin: Akademie-Verlag.
Peek, W. 1972. Neue Inschriften aus Epidauros, Berlin: Akademie-Verlag.

 

 Bronwen L. Wickkiser. Asklepios, Medicine, and the Politics of Healing in Fifth-Century Greece: Between Craft and Cult. Baltimore 2008.

References

Temples of Asclepius
Epidaurus
4th-century BC religious buildings and structures